Robert Begerau (born 17 July 1947 in Büdelsdorf) is a former German footballer.

Begerau made two appearances for Fortuna Düsseldorf in the Bundesliga during his playing career, which was cut short through injury.

References

External links 
 

1947 births
Living people
People from Kaarst
Sportspeople from Düsseldorf (region)
German footballers
Association football defenders
Bundesliga players
Fortuna Düsseldorf players
Heinrich Heine University Düsseldorf alumni
Footballers from North Rhine-Westphalia